The Goring Hotel is a 5-star hotel in Belgravia, London. It is located near Buckingham Palace. Its restaurant, The Dining Room, holds one Michelin Star.

History
The Goring Hotel was opened by Otto Richard Goring on 2 March 1910 and professed to be the first hotel in the world in which every room had a private bathroom and central heating. In 1914, The Goring became the command centre for the Chief of Allied Forces, and contact with President Woodrow Wilson during World War I was made from this hotel. In November 1917 it became the U.S. Army Headquarters in London, as it was adjacent to the American Naval and Military authorities. The hotel was released back to its owners on 8 September 1919.

In 1919, Lady Randolph Churchill, the mother of Winston Churchill, moved into The Goring Hotel. During World War II, the Fox Film crew stayed at the hotel on their way to film footage of the D-Day invasion.

The hotel is the only remaining hotel in London that is still owned and run by the family that built it. The Queen Mother was a regular at The Goring. The Goring has held a royal warrant of appointment from Queen Elizabeth II since 2013, and it is the only hotel to have been granted this honor.

In 2011, Kate Middleton and her family were based at the hotel for the days around her wedding to Prince William. The Duchess stayed in the Royal Suite the night before she got married. She returned to the hotel while eight months pregnant to mark renovations that had taken place, which included a newly decorated front hall.

References

External links
Official site

Hotels in London
Hotels established in 1910
Hotel buildings completed in 1910